Jesper Frismann (born 21 March 1961) is a Danish dressage rider, who participated for the Danish silver medalist team at the European Dressage Championship in Copenhagen in 1985, on the horse Clermont.

Today, Jesper Frismann owns a dressage stable near Elsinore, Denmark.
Jesper Frismann's teaching is based on the correct posture of the rider and always takes an offset to the horse. In addition, Jesper Frismann always puts great emphasis in the horse being correctly warmed up and loosened, before starting the individual dressage lessons.

References
RIDEHESTEN.COM: Husker du …EM 1985?
Rideforbund.dk: EM dressur senior hold- Dansk Ride Forbund (the Danish equestrian association):  Mesterskabshistorik

1961 births
Danish male equestrians
Living people